London 2012: The Official Video Game is the official Olympic video game of the 2012 Summer Olympics in London. It was published by Sega and developed by Sega Studios Australia, making this the first Olympics title to be developed in-house by Sega. The iOS and Android versions were developed and published by NEOWIZ.

It is also the second official video game based on the 2012 Olympics, the other being Mario & Sonic at the London 2012 Olympic Games.

The game features 37 countries, and 31 events. New disciplines included 10m Synchronised Platform Diving, Trampoline, Beach Volleyball and Keirin.

The game features an online mode for players wishing to compete with other challengers worldwide. The "national pride" is a ranking system in the online mode, where the players have the possibility to collect medals for their favourite country.

It is compatible with PlayStation Move and Xbox Kinect for certain events in the party mode.

London 2012 is the first Olympics video game to include cooperative events in the local multiplayer mode.

Disciplines

These events are in the game:

The game therefore includes 8 of the events from the decathlon (only missing pole vault and 1500 metres).

Nations represented

Reception

London 2012 received "mixed or average reviews" on all platforms according to the review aggregation website Metacritic.

Chris Schilling of IGN said of the PlayStation 3 and Xbox 360 versions that "Sega's celebration of the year's biggest sporting event is better than you might expect." In his opinion, the events of both versions would not hold up too well in the long term, but that is not really what an Olympics game is about. He praised the online and offline multiplayer mode. The German PC game magazine GameStar criticized the gameplay, because it is almost impossible to play it with the mouse and the keyboard, so the player is forced to get a gamepad to play London 2012. They also mentioned that the gameplay of the events would not be different from each other and that the AI of the computer opponents is not balanced.

The Digital Fix gave the PS3 version seven out of ten and said it was "a fine example of an Olympics type game. The presentation is excellent, the events are more varied than you might expect and the subtleties of controls mean you'll have a wonderful time as you begin any experience with the game." Metro gave the Xbox 360 version a similar score of seven out of ten and said it was "Not just an Olympics tie-in but a proper sports game, with the majority of events finding a good balance between realism and enjoyment." However, Digital Spy gave the same console version three stars out of five and said, "There are lots of events that can be enjoyed time and time again, although far less than the 46 advertised. Motion controls add very little, but do at least offer new ways to experience the game, alongside a plethora of game modes. While London 2012: The Game may fall short of Gold, it's certainly deserving of a respectable Bronze."

The game held the top spot of the UK All Format chart for three weeks following its release. It reached number 9 in the PS3 PAL downloads chart. As of May 2013, the game has sold 680,000 copies in the US and Europe.

References

External links
 
 

2012 video games
2012 Summer Olympics
Android (operating system) games
Cycling video games
IOS games
Kinect games
Multiplayer and single-player video games
Multiple-sport video games
Summer Olympic video games
PlayStation 3 games
PlayStation Move-compatible games
Sega video games
Table tennis video games
Video games developed in Australia
Video games set in 2012
Video games set in London
Video games using Havok
Volleyball video games
Water sports video games
Windows games
Xbox 360 games